IronKey is the brand name of a family of encrypted USB portable storage devices owned by Kingston Digital, the flash memory affiliate of Kingston Technology Company, Inc.

History
From 2005 to 2012, IronKey was an Internet security and privacy company based in California. IronKey's founding was partially funded by the U.S. federal government, with a grant of US$1.4 million through the Homeland Security Research Projects Agency. Their products have been used by the U.S. government in various areas.

Imation acquired IronKey in September 2011. In October 2012, IronKey rebranded itself as Marble Security, and the IronKey brand became wholly owned by Imation. As part of Imation, the IronKey portfolio includes products and intellectual property from the former IronKey, as well as technologies from Imation acquisitions of MXI Security and ENCRYPTX.

On February 8, 2016, Kingston Technology Company, Inc., announced it had acquired the USB technology and assets of IronKey from Imation. 

On February 8, 2016, DataLocker Inc. announced it had acquired Ironkey's Enterprise Management Service (EMS) and other assets from Imation. 

In November 2018, Kingston announced that the IronKey had new features and was now FIPS 140-2 Level 3 certified.

In early 2021, a reported 7,000 Bitcoin were stranded in a IronKey flash drive due to a forgotten password. The owner, Programmer Stefan Thomas, did not utilize the Enterprise Management Service for password recovery.

Windows To Go portable workspaces
Among Imation’s IronKey products are flash drives certified by Microsoft for Windows To Go. Windows To Go is an enterprise feature of Windows 8 that enables the creation of a workspace that can be booted from a USB-connected external drive on PCs that meet Microsoft certification requirements, regardless of the operating system running on the PC. A Windows To Go product, the IronKey Workspace W300, received the Editors’ Choice accolade from PC Magazine in February 2013.

Products

Secure Portable Storage
IronKey Enterprise S250 and D250 USB flash drives
IronKey F200 Biometric Flash Drive 
IronKey Basic S250 and D250 USB flash drives 
IronKey F150 Flash Drive 
IronKey Personal S250 and D250 USB flash drives 
IronKey H100 External USB Hard Drive 
IronKey H200 Biometric External USB Hard Drive 
IronKey F100 Flash Drive 
IronKey D80 Flash Drive
IronKey H80 External USB Hard Drive
IronKey D300S USB Flash Drive
IronKey D300SM USB Flash Drive
IronKey S1000 Encrypted USB Flash Drive

IronKey Secure Workspaces
Windows 8:
IronKey Workspace W700 Windows To Go (Microsoft certified, FIPS Certified)
IronKey Workspace W500 Windows To Go  (Microsoft certified)
IronKey Workspace W300 Windows To Go  (Microsoft certified)

Windows 7:
IronKey Workspace MWES USB Flash Drive with Microsoft Windows Embedded Standard (MWES) edition software.

References

External links
 

Solid-state computer storage media